Katarzyna Karasińska (born 24 October 1982 in Wroclaw) is a world class Polish alpine skier. She achieved 5th place in the International Ski Federation's 2005 European Cup slalom event. She also competed in the 2006 Winter Olympics, ranking #30 in Women's slalom, and in the 2005 Alpine Skiing World Cup, ranking #41 in Women's Slalom.

References

1982 births
Living people
Polish female alpine skiers
Olympic alpine skiers of Poland
Alpine skiers at the 2006 Winter Olympics
Universiade medalists in alpine skiing
Sportspeople from Wrocław
Universiade gold medalists for Poland
Universiade bronze medalists for Poland
Competitors at the 2007 Winter Universiade
Competitors at the 2009 Winter Universiade
21st-century Polish women